The Lemmenjoki is a river in the northern part of the Finnish province of Lapland.

The name of the river comes from the Sami word "Leammijohka", meaning "warm river". Due to an erroneous folk etymology, the form Lemmenjoki is often associated with the Finnish word lempi (genitive form lemmen), meaning "love".

The Lemmenjoki National Park derives its name from the river.

Rivers of Finland
Paatsjoki basin
Landforms of Lapland (Finland)
Rivers of Inari, Finland